is a retired Japanese footballer. He is a defender.

He was educated at and played for the National Institute of Fitness and Sports in Kanoya before signing for J2 club, V-Varen Nagasaki.  In 2016, he signed for Albirex Niigata FC (Singapore) from the S.League before moving to Sleauge club, Hougang United. In 2018, he signed for Cambodian club Phnom Penh Crown FC. On 7 March 2019, he announced his retirement from football at the age of 27.

Club career statistics
As of Jan 2, 2017

References

External links

1991 births
Living people
Japanese footballers
Singapore Premier League players
Albirex Niigata Singapore FC players
Association football defenders
Phnom Penh Crown FC players
Expatriate footballers in Cambodia
Japanese expatriate sportspeople in Cambodia